The Agfa Ambiflex was a SLR for 35mm film, made by Agfa in c.1960. It was made for interchangeable lenses but had a leaf shutter. Its viewfinder unit could also be exchanged – there were pentaprism and waist-level finders. The Ambiflex was equipped with a coupled selenium light meter and a self-timer.

External links
Agfa Ambiflex at Sylvain Halgand's  www.collection-appareils.fr

Agfa SLR cameras
Cameras introduced in 1960